Redha Abujabarah (born 27 October 1996) is a Kuwaiti football player who plays for Kazma and the Kuwait national team.

On 5 September 2019, Abujabarrah scored his first goal for Kuwait at the 2022 FIFA World Cup qualification against Nepal in a 7–0 victory.

International career

Goals

References

External links
 

1996 births
Living people
Kuwaiti footballers
Kuwait international footballers
Association football midfielders
Qadsia SC players
Kazma SC players
Kuwait Premier League players